Swarovski Optik is a division of the Swarovski group of companies, manufacturing optical instruments. Its headquarters are located in Absam, Tyrol, Austria.

History 
Wilhelm Swarovski, son of the original founder, was born in 1918. In 1935, with the help of his father, he developed a prism fabrication and grinding process that he used in the design of his first 6×30 binocular. In 1949 he has founded SWAROVSKI OPTIK KG in Absam, Tyro, to produce the Habicht 7×42 that it continues produce today.

 1935 First Swarovski binoculars, which was a 6×30
 1949 Formation of Swarovski Optik
 1959 First Swarovski Optik rifle scope (4×32)
 1967 First Swarovski Optik extendable spotting scope (30×75)
 1974 Kahles was purchased by Swarovski Optik
 1977 Kahles became a branch of Swarovski Optik
 1989 Kahles Limited again became an independent company within the Swarovski group
 1991 First AT 80 telescope
 1993 First hunting rifle scope with reticle illumination
 1995 First rifle scope with integrated laser range finder
 1999 First binoculars with wrap-around grip, named EL
 2007 First Swarovski rifle scope with 6× zoom
 2016 First Swarovski rifle scope with 8× zoom
 2017 Kahles was again brought into the Swarovski advertising and sales programs

Overview 
SWAROVSKI OPTIK, headquartered in Absam, Tyrol, Austria is part of the Swarovski group.of companies. Founded in 1949, the Austrian company specialises in the development and manufacturing of long-range optical instruments in the premium segment of the market, including binoculars, telescopes (spotting scopes), rifle scopes, range finders and night sight devices. The binoculars, spotting scopes, rifle scopes, and optronic instruments are products of choice for demanding users. The company’s success is based on its innovative strength, the quality and intrinsic value of its products, and their functional and esthetic design. The appreciation of nature is an essential part of its company philosophy and is reflected commendably in its environment-friendly production and its long-term commitment to selected nature conservation projects. The turnover in 2020 was 163.5 million euros (2019: 158.7 million euros), with an export ratio of 91%. The company has around 1,000 employees.

Product Range 

Swarovski Optik produces the following series of products.

Binoculars

 Habicht 
 CL, includes CL Nomad
 SLC 
 EL 
 EL Range (green and orange) 
 NL Pure

Spotting scopes

 CTC, CTS
 ATS, STS
 STR     
 ATX, STX 
 ATX Interior   
 BTX   
 ST Vista

Rifle scopes

 Z3 (American market only)
 Z5 (American market only)
 Z5i 
 X5i 
 Z6i  
 Z8i 
 Ds

References 

Swarovski BTX 95mm review

External links 
 

British Royal Warrant holders
Manufacturing companies established in 1949
Manufacturing companies of Austria
Optics manufacturing companies
Telescope manufacturers
Austrian brands